St Albans Secondary College is a public high school located at St Albans, Victoria, Australia, in Melbourne's western suburbs. The coeducational school caters for students from Year 7 to Year 12. It is recognised for its academic excellence, strong social and cultural values and high university admission rates. The principal of the school since 2006 is Kerrie Dowsley.

History 
The school was established in 1956. It has more than 1600 students and 100 teachers.

In pop culture
On 3 March 1976 the school hosted the Australian hard-rock band AC/DC. Performed early in the band's career, footage of the songs "T.N.T." and "School Days" can be found on the Two Disk DVD Edition titled Plug Me In. Two more songs, including "It's a Long Way to the Top" and "She's Got Balls" are included on the Collectors Edition 3 DVD Set.

References

External links
School website

Public high schools in Melbourne
Educational institutions established in 1956
1956 establishments in Australia
Buildings and structures in the City of Brimbank